The Ministry of Sugar Industry Development is a Sri Lankan government ministry.

List of ministers

The Minister of Sugar Industry Development is an appointment in the Cabinet of Sri Lanka.

Parties

See also
 List of ministries of Sri Lanka

References

External links
 Government of Sri Lanka

Sugar Industry Development
Sugar industry